The Ex-PM (pronounced 'ex P.M.') is an Australian television comedy series that first aired on ABC on Wednesday 14 October 2015. The six-part series is written by and stars Shaun Micallef with director Sian Davies and producer Nick Murray for Cordell Jigsaw Zapruder. The series focuses on Andrew Dugdale (Micallef), a fictional former Prime Minister of Australia, who struggles to adjust to private life.

Season two of the show premiered on 26 October 2017.

Synopsis

Series 1
Former prime minister Andrew Dugdale owes his publishers an advance, and is assigned a ghostwriter to help him get his memoirs done.

Series 2
Dugdale stands for election in a marginal rural seat at his party's request. Moving into the town's sewage farm, he campaigns on local issues in a race beset by corruption. A mysterious benefactor donates one million dollars to his campaign.

Cast

Main
 Shaun Micallef as Andrew Dugdale
 Lucy Honigman as Ellen
 Nicki Wendt as Catherine
 Kate Jenkinson as Carol
 Nicholas Bell as Sonny
 Francis Greenslade as Curtis
 Jackson Tozer as Myles 
 Ming-Zhu Hii as Rita
 John Clarke as Henry

Recurring
 Drew Tingwell as Mr Vole
 Owen Wahrenberger as Stefan
 Nick Farnell as George

Episodes

Series overview

Season 1 (2015)

Season 2 (2017)

See also
List of Australian television series
List of Australian Broadcasting Corporation programs

References

External links

2015 Australian television series debuts
Australian Broadcasting Corporation original programming
Australian comedy television series